Unser is a surname, and may refer to:

People with the name
 The Unser family, a prominent family of American auto racing drivers:
 First generation:
 Louis Unser (1896-1979), a nine-time winner of the Pikes Peak Hillclimb.
 Second generation (all brothers, and also nephews of Louis):
 Jerry Unser (1932–1959)
 Bobby Unser (1934–2021)
 Al Unser (1939–2021)
 Third generation:
 Johnny Unser (born 1958), son of Jerry
 Al Unser Jr. (born 1962), son of Al
 Robby Unser (born 1968), son of Bobby
 Fourth generation:
 Al Unser III (born 1982), son of Al Jr.
 Father-and-son American baseball players:
 Al Unser (1912–1995)
 Del Unser (born 1944)

Fictional characters
Wayne Unser, a fictional character on the FX television series Sons of Anarchy

See also
Al Unser (disambiguation)

German-language surnames